Mauro Scatularo (born January 26, 1988 in Buenos Aires, Argentina) is an Argentine footballer currently playing for Club Deportivo UAI Urquiza of the Primera División C in Argentina.

Teams
  Deportes Puerto Montt 2010–2011
  UAI Urquiza 2012

External links
 

1988 births
Living people
Argentine footballers
Argentine expatriate footballers
Puerto Montt footballers
Primera B de Chile players
Expatriate footballers in Chile
Argentine expatriate sportspeople in Chile
Association footballers not categorized by position
Footballers from Buenos Aires